"Coconut Juice" is the debut single by American rapper Tyga featuring Travis McCoy (of Gym Class Heroes). The song was first released on March 22, 2008 as the lead and second from single from the rapper's debut studio album, No Introduction (2008). The song contains a sample of the track "Coconut" by Harry Nilsson. Pete Wentz and Young Money-founder Lil Wayne make cameos in the track's Dale "Rage" Resteghini-directed music video. The song features additional production by Martin Johnson.

Remix
The official remix has a slightly new beat, a new verse by Tyga, and featured verses from Young Money labelmate Lil Wayne and Alabama rapper Rich Boy. The remix was produced by Jon Famous.

Charts

References

2008 debut singles
Travie McCoy songs
Tyga songs
Song recordings produced by S*A*M and Sluggo
2008 songs
Songs written by Tyga
Songs written by Travie McCoy
Music videos directed by Dale Resteghini